Senator Tydings may refer to:

 Millard Tydings (1890-1961), U.S.  Congressman and Senator from Maryland
 Joseph Tydings (1928-2018), his son, also a U.S. Senator from Maryland